Daybreaker may refer to:

Music 
 Daybreaker (Beth Orton album), 2002, or the title song
 Daybreaker (Architects album), 2012
 Daybreaker (Electric Light Orchestra song), a B-side to the single "Ma-Ma-Ma Belle" from the 1973 album On the Third Day
 Daybreaker (Moon Taxi album), 2015

Fictional characters 
 Daybreaker, the evil version of Princess Celestia from My Little Pony: Friendship Is Magic

See also 
 Daybreak (disambiguation)
 Daybreakers, 2009 film